De Leon Municipal Airport  was a public use airport located one nautical mile (1.85 km) southeast of the central business district of De Leon, a city in Comanche County, Texas, United States.

The airport is closed and was removed from FAA records between May and July 2009.

Facilities and aircraft 
It had one asphalt paved runway designated 15/33 which measured 2,400 by 20 feet (732 x 6 m). For the 12-month period ending July 5, 1996, the airport had 300 general aviation aircraft operations, an average of 25 per month.

References

External links 
 

Defunct airports in Texas
Airports in Texas
Buildings and structures in Comanche County, Texas
Transportation in Comanche County, Texas